The cümbüş is a Turkish stringed instrument of relatively modern origin. It was developed in 1930 by Zeynel Abidin Cümbüş (1881–1947) as an oud-like instrument that could be heard as part of a larger ensemble.

The cümbüş is shaped like an American banjo, with a spun-aluminum resonator bowl and skin soundboard. Although originally configured as an oud, the instrument has been converted to other instruments by attaching a different set of neck and strings. The standard cümbüş is fretless, but guitar, mandolin and ukulele versions have fretboards. The neck is adjustable, allowing the musician to change the angle of the neck to its strings by turning a screw. One model is made with a wooden resonator bowl, with the effect of a less tinny, softer sound.

Origin of the maker and the name

The word cümbüş is derived from the Turkish for "revelry" or "fun", as the instrument was marketed as a popular alternative to the more costly classical oud. Unlike inventors who name their inventions after themselves, Zeynel Abidin Cümbüş took his last name from his instrument.  He was born Zeynel Abidin in Skopje, Macedonia and immigrated to Beyazit, Istanbul, Turkey. His name is often written "Zeynel Abidin Bey" online in Turkey, where Bey is an honorific, such as mister. Early instruments show his name as he wrote it "Zeynelabidin" (a single name, not two). When Mustafa Kemal Atatürk decreed that families take surnames in 1934, Zeynel Abidin adopted the name of his famous instrument.

Rising and falling with social tides
After the Turkish War of Independence Zeynel Abidin Cümbüş wanted to create a new instrument to embody the ideals of peace, an instrument for the masses. He switched his company from dealing with arms to manufacturing musical instruments for "the support of peace through music." In a meeting with Mustafa Kemal Atatürk, the founder of the Republic of Turkey, he showed one of his new inventions. It was "an inexpensive instrument easy to transport and hard to break, capable of playing both Eastern alaturka music and, with a quick change of removable necks, Western alafranga music as well." It was a modern instrument for a modern country.

The cümbüş was inexpensive and was bought by people who couldn't afford a more expensive instrument; as a result, his dream of the masses accepting it was marginalized. The instrument became a folk instrument of the poor and of ethnic minorities in Turkey, including Rûm, Armenians, Jews, Kurds, and Romani, "playing indigenous folk music or repertoires shared with ethnic Turks." It was excluded specifically by classical musicians of the era, being seen as lower-class or ethnic. A perception grew of it being "other" or ethnic or different or lower-class, and Turkish society did not adopt the instrument widely. By the 1960s, use of the cümbüş declined among these minorities, except for Román professional musicians. They adopted the instrument because of its ability to be heard alongside the other instruments they played at weddings and parties.

Turnaround
Beginning in the mid-1990s, more people started to take up the instrument again at Armenian and Jewish folk music revivals and in Kurdish and Romani folk music recordings. It has been since taken up by modern Turkish-rock and techno musicians, some making statements with the way the music sounds, and others apolitical or humanistic or spiritual.

Cümbüş today
Cümbüş Music is still an active company in Istanbul and manufactures a wide range of traditional Turkish instruments. The instruments are hand made in the family's workshop in Istanbul, by three members of the Cümbüş family, Naci Abidin Cümbüş and his two sons Fethi and Alizeynel. They still make approximately 3000 cümbüşes a year (as of 2002). They also manufacture about 5000 darbukas per year (middle-eastern drums), and sell guitars as well.  They export approximately half the cümbüşes to the United States, France and Greece.

Models

The Cümbüş Company in Istanbul, Turkey manufactures several different models. They include:
 Cümbüş: tuned like an oud, short neck, fretless, six courses of strings, 34 inches long overall
 Cümbüş Extra: like the standard cümbüş but has wooden resonator instead of metal
 Cümbüş Saz: tuned like the a bağlama, long neck, tie-on frets, three courses of strings, 40 inches long overall
 Cümbüş Cura: tuned like the bağlama saz but higher pitched as a cura saz, three courses of strings, 29 inches long overall
 Cümbüş Tambur: tuned like the tambur, also spelled tanbur; super long neck, three courses of strings, 51 inches long overall
 Cümbüş Bowed-Tambur: tuned like a Yaylı tambur, played with a bow
 Cümbüş Guitar: fretted, tuned like a guitar, six strings, 34 inches long overall
 Cümbüş Banco: fretted, small, tuned like a mandolin four courses of strings 23 inches long overall
 Cümbüş Ukalele: fretted, small, tuned like a ukulele, four strings, 21 inches long overall

Tuning

Standard cümbüş
The cümbüş has its own tuning, but can be tuned the same as an oud.

 Cümbüş: AA2 BB2 EE3 AA3 DD4 GG4

Use in Western popular music 
 David Lindley played a cümbüş with Ry Cooder in the soundtrack of Paris, Texas.
 Pink Floyd guitarist David Gilmour played cümbüş on his solo album On An Island on the track "Then I Close My Eyes". It can also be heard on the album  opener "Castellorizon". He also used the instrument to play the same parts on the subsequent tour, performances of which can be seen and heard on the DVDs Remember That Night and Live in Gdańsk.
 Stone Temple Pilots guitarist Dean DeLeo played a cümbüş on the album Shangri-La Dee Da on the track "Regeneration". It can be heard during the chorus.
 Smokey Hormel played a cümbüş on Tom Waits' Mule Variations.
 The Hollies' "Stop Stop Stop"
 Guitarist/multi-instrumentalist Eenor played a modified tambur-cümbüş (Jim Bush) for Les Claypool's side project Colonel Les Claypool's Fearless Flying Frog Brigade on "Shattering Song" (Live Frogs Set 1) as well as on "The Buzzards of Green Hill" (Purple Onion).
 Lu Edmonds played one the 2012 North American Tour of PiL (Public Image Ltd.),, continues to play it with The Mekons as of 2018, and recorded it with Blabbermouth in 2019.

Turkish area musicians
 Gevende - cümbüş is played by band member Okan Kaya
 Udi Mısırlı Ibrahim Efendi - Jewish late/post-Ottoman ud-ist and composer
 Selahattin Pınar - early 20th-century tanbur player
 Ercüment Batanay - mid-20th-century yaylı tanbur player
 "Kazancı" Bedih Yoluk and son Naci Yoluk - 20th-century folk musicians from Urfa
 Cahit Berkay - in the 1960s "Anatolian rock"; folk-rock hybrid band Moğollar (especially bowed tanbur)
 Yurdal Tokcan - classically trained ud-ist
 Ara Dinkjian - Armenian-American fusion musician
 Harun Tekin in the Turkish rock band Mor ve Ötesi

See also
 Banjo guitar
 Banjo mandolin
 Banjo ukulele

References

External links
 The cümbüş manufacturer's website (in Turkish)
 Pictures of a 1934 cümbüş and a story about a trip Ederer took to the cümbüş factory
 History of the Cümbüş
 Dromedary - American world music group that features the cümbüş
 Jack Campin's page with photos and technical description
 Eric Ederer's ethnomusicological site, with info on the cümbüş' history

Banjo family instruments
Drumhead lutes
Mandolin family instruments
Turkish music
Turkish musical instruments
Turkish words and phrases
Turkish inventions
Instruments of Ottoman classical music
Instruments of Turkish makam music